Orlin Rusev (born 3 August 1972) is a Bulgarian judoka. He competed in the men's extra-lightweight event at the 1992 Summer Olympics.

Achievements

References

External links

1972 births
Living people
Bulgarian male judoka
Olympic judoka of Bulgaria
Judoka at the 1992 Summer Olympics